Candler is an unincorporated community in Hall County, in the U.S. state of Georgia.

History
The community was named after Allen D. Candler, 56th Governor of Georgia. The Georgia General Assembly incorporated the place as the "Town of Candler" in 1910. The town's charter was officially dissolved in 1995.

References

Unincorporated communities in Hall County, Georgia
Unincorporated communities in Georgia (U.S. state)
Populated places disestablished in 1995